Ángel Sauce, (born in Caracas, Venezuela on August 2, 1911; died in Caracas, Venezuela on December 26, 1995) was a Venezuelan composer, violinist and conductor. He was founder of multiple choirs and orchestras, and for more than twelve years he directed the Venezuela Symphony Orchestra. He received two National Music Prizes in Venezuela, one in 1948 for his composition Cecilia Mujica and one in 1982 for general achievements in his lengthy career.

References

Ángel Sauce - Venezuelatuya.com
Venezuela Symphony orchestra Magazine, 25th anniversary, 1955.

See also
Venezuela
Venezuelan music

1911 births
1995 deaths
People from Caracas
Venezuelan classical violinists
Male classical violinists
Venezuelan composers
Male composers
20th-century classical violinists
20th-century composers
20th-century male musicians